Freja Hellenberg (born 3 September 1989) is a Swedish footballer defender who played for Kopparbergs/Göteborg FC, her last known football club participation is in Djurgårdens IF FF in 2017.

References

External links 
Avaldsnes IL
Runner-up
 Toppserien: 2015
 Norwegian Women's Cup (2): 2013, 2015

External links 
 
 

1989 births
Living people
Swedish women's footballers
Swedish expatriate women's footballers
Swedish expatriate sportspeople in Norway
Djurgårdens IF Fotboll (women) players
Avaldsnes IL players
BK Häcken FF players
Damallsvenskan players
Toppserien players
Expatriate women's footballers in Norway
Women's association football defenders